North Carolina Highway 275 (NC 275) is a primary state highway in the U.S. state of North Carolina. It connects the cities of Bessemer City, Dallas, and Stanley.

Route description

History
The highway was established in 1930 as a new primary routing from U.S. Route 74 (US 74) and NC 20 (now NC 274) near Bessemer City to NC 27 in Stanley. The route has changed little since.

Junction list

References

275
Transportation in Gaston County, North Carolina